The Desh Sevak Party was a political party in India. It was led by veteran leaders of the Indian National Army, General Mohan Singh and Col. Gurbaksh Singh Dhillon. In October 1949 it merged with the All India Forward Bloc. Singh became the Forward Bloc chairman of AIFB and Dhillon the general secretary.

Sources
Bose, K., Forward Bloc, Madras: Tamil Nadu Academy of Political Science, 1988.

Defunct political parties in India
Political parties with year of establishment missing
Political parties disestablished in 1949
1949 disestablishments in India
All India Forward Bloc